MBE Worldwide S.p.A. ("MBE"), is a third-party provider of shipping, fulfillment, print and marketing via a network of franchised locations. MBE is a family-owned Italian holding company based in Milan, Italy. It is one of the world's largest networks of Service Centers offering shipping, logistics, printing, marketing and design to business and private customers.

History 

Mail Boxes Etc. (MBE) was founded in the United States in 1980 by Gerald Aul, Pat Senn and Robert Diais. By 2000, MBE had expanded to 4,000 locations including Korea and Sweden.

MBE is a network of retail centers offering pack and ship, logistics, communications and marketing services to business and private customers.

 

On December 31, 2016, MBE Worldwide had almost 1,600 locations in 30 countries, with aggregated sales of €427 million in 2016.

Acquired by UPS 
In 2001, UPS acquired Mail Boxes Etc., Inc. locations in the United States and Canada. On April 7, 2003, UPS began converting the 3,000 Mail Boxes Etc. locations in the United States and Canada (at the time, nearly 90% of the domestic U.S. network) to The UPS Store and began offering lower (around 20% on average) UPS direct shipping rates. 

The centers remain locally owned and operated, and continue to offer a variety of packing, shipping, freight, postal, printing and business services.

MBE Worldwide Group 
In 2009, MBE Worldwide was formed to acquire the existing Mail Boxes Etc. network from UPS across the world except the United States and Canada. MBE Worldwide began to expand across western Europe, establishing a direct presence in France in 2012, Poland in 2014, and in the UK and Republic of Ireland in 2021.

Acquisitions 
In 2017, MBE Worldwide acquired two US companies, PostNet International Franchise and AlphaGraphics Inc. With these acquisitions, the MBE network now reaches around 2,500 service centers, including 500 in the US and 2,000 in 43 countries around the world. In 2021, MBE Worldwide acquired Pack & Send, a leading brand in Australia, New Zealand and UK in the Shipping and Logistics service industry, and MultiCopy, a leading brand in the Netherlands that provides Print and Marketing Solutions from sign, print and websites. In addition, Prestashop joined the MBE Worldwide group in November 2021, propelling MBE Worldwide towrds becoming a fully integrated digital and physical commerce platform for business growth.  MBE Worldwide acquired leading e-commerce platform  In 2022, MBE Worldwide purchased a majority stake in the UK company World Options Ltd. and an Italian tech platform dedicated to proximity logistics, GEL Proximity.

References 

Logistics companies of Italy
Companies based in Milan
Retail companies established in 1980
Transport companies established in 1980
United Parcel Service
2001 mergers and acquisitions